Psychotherapy is a peer-reviewed academic journal published by the American Psychological Association on behalf of APA Division 29. The journal was established in 1963 and covers research in psychotherapy. The current editor-in-chief is Mark Hilsenroth (Adelphi University).

Abstracting and indexing 
The journal is abstracted and indexed by MEDLINE/PubMed and the Social Sciences Citation Index. According to the Journal Citation Reports, the journal has a 2020 impact factor of 6.596.

References

External links 
 

American Psychological Association academic journals
English-language journals
Quarterly journals
Psychotherapy journals
Publications established in 1963